Pycnothelia is a genus of lichen-forming fungi in the family Cladoniaceae. Pycnothelia was promoted to generic status by French naturalist Léon Jean Marie Dufour in 1821; it was originally circumscribed by Erik Acharius in 1799 as a section of the now-defunct genus Cenomyce.

Species
Pycnothelia caliginosa 
Pycnothelia mascarena 
Pycnothelia papillaria

References

Cladoniaceae
Lichen genera
Lecanorales genera
Taxa described in 1821
Taxa named by Léon Jean Marie Dufour